Caihongqiao Station is a station on Line 8 of the Guangzhou Metro. It is situated underground near the Southwest gate of the Liuhua Lake Park.

Due to construction delays, the station could not open with the rest of the Northern Extension of Line 8 in 2020 and was hence delayed to open on 28 September 2 years later.

Station Layout

Exits

Future Developments
Caihongqiao station will become an interchange station with Line 11 by the end of 2023 and Line 13 Phase 2 by 2024. Cross-platform interchange will be utilised between lines 11 and 13 at 1 level above Line 8. The station will also interchange with Line 22 Northern extension by 2027 and its platforms will be 1 level below Line 8. Paid linkways linking all concourses between all 4 lines will be built at Basement 2 of the whole Caihongqiao station.

References

Guangzhou Metro stations in Liwan District
Railway stations in China opened in 2022